2011–12 Segona Divisió was the 13th season of second-tier football in Andorra.

Regular stage

League table

Results

Relegation play-offs
The seventh-placed club in the league competed in a two-legged relegation playoff against the runners-up of the Segona Divisió, for one spot in 2012–13 Primera Divisió.

External links
 

Segona Divisió seasons
Andorra
2011–12 in Andorran football